The Skrull Kill Krew are a fictional group appearing in American comic books published by Marvel Comics. They first appeared in their own miniseries published in 1995. They were created by Grant Morrison, Mark Millar and Steve Yeowell.

The group are humans modified by eating Skrull-infected beef. Some of the team returned during the Skrulls' Secret Invasion, which led to another miniseries.

Publication history
The team first appeared in their own eponymous series written by Grant Morrison and Mark Millar, published in 1995. It was one of Tom Brevoort's first projects and came about when Morrison and Millar faxed the Marvel offices looking for work:

The original idea for the team name was the Skrull Kill Kult, based on the band Thrill Kill Kult, but Marvel's Editor-in-Chief Tom DeFalco objected to the use of "Kult" because "he felt that it made the series seem like too much of an endorsement of murder cults". Brendan McCarthy designed the characters and Steve Yeowell was brought on board to provide the pencils, the same division of labor on Morrison's Zenith, because of "a lukewarm reception to Steve's initial visualizations".

The series was originally announced as an ongoing series. However, it was changed to a miniseries, because of wider problems in the American comic book market in the mid-1990s and changes at Marvel, with DeFalco leaving. There were four issues worth of scripts done at the time and Brevoort managed to argue for a fifth to close the miniseries.

They then made an appearance in Avengers: The Initiative #16 as one of the Secret Invasion tie-ins and writer Dan Slott announced at the 2008 Baltimore Comic-Con that they would be getting a new miniseries featuring the new line-up. It was a five-issue miniseries written by Adam Felber, and saw the original team brought back together to fight the descendants of the original Skrull-cows.

Fictional team biography

The Fantastic Four, at the beginning of their superhero career defeated a group of Skrull spies. Reed Richards brainwashed them into becoming cows and retaining that form for life. The Skrull-cows at one point regained their memories and Skrull forms in the Kree-Skrull War, leading to the death of one of them. The other three were turned over to the U.S. government and restored to cows in form and mind.

The milk from these cows affected the inhabitants of a small dairy town named King's Crossing, giving them shapeshifting powers. The Fantastic Four, via a girl that Johnny Storm was dating at the time, ended up investigating the town and neutralizing the threat.

They were then (apparently by accident) shipped to a slaughterhouse and butchered as beef. Some of the meat eaten by people transferred the Skrull's adaptable DNA code into the humans' cells, resulting in a bizarre condition called Skrullovoria-Induced Skrullophobia, in which these individuals not only gained shapeshifting powers equal to, or greater than, actual Skrulls, but also developed an intense fear or hatred of Skrulls. Only a small number of humans proved susceptible to this syndrome and most did not survive the initial stages of infection. But several people who proved somewhat longer-lived (though they were still dying) were gathered together by a man known only as Ryder, who was himself a victim of the disease, to act out their increasingly irrational impulses to seek out and destroy the ones who did this to them (by "letting" themselves get turned into cows), usually by graphically "blowing away" the Skrulls with high-powered weapons.

Their desire to kill Skrulls not only stopped many plots which endangered humans, it also led them to fight other well-known Marvel characters, such as Baron Strucker and Captain America.

Secret Invasion

Ryder and Riot return to ferret out more Skrulls. The other three are still alive, their heads kept in jars, as their Skrull infestation has resulted in the loss of their bodies. They encounter the 3-D Man II in the New Mexico desert and save him from a Skrull posing as the 'She-Thing'. The 3-D Man II joins them in rooting out Blacksmith of the Desert Stars, another Skrull, and killing him as well. They were next seen helping Nevada's Fifty State Initiative team, the Heavy Hitters, deal with a Skrull posing as an unnamed team member. They found out that in every Initiative state team is one Skrull-impostor and decided to kill them all. Komodo and her lover Hardball both join with the team as well. The Skrull Kill Krew thought they would not be able to track Skrulls through all the states on time, but then former Avenger Jocasta appeared with the Devil-Slayer, who is a member of the Hawaiian Initiative team, the Point Men. The Devil-Slayer has teleportation powers, thus allowing the group to speed up their plans. Most Skrull-killing incidents end with a few more ad-hoc recruits.

Later, Ryder reveals that he still has the heads of Moonstomp, Dice and Catwalk, who can also track down Skrulls. He gives the three heads to the speedsters the Whiz Kid, the Spinner and Nonstop. The team splits up into six different squads, each one to search for the six remaining Skrull sleeper agents within the Initiative teams. Also, they are to destroy the devices within each Initiative building that could assist the Skrulls in destroying the United States. Despite multiple failures (including the death of the Spinner), the devices are never set off.

After the Skrulls are defeated, Moonstomp, Dice and Catwalk's heads all die, and Riot reverts to human form, dying as well. The 3-D Man II and Ryder then leave her behind and set out to find and kill any Skrulls that might still be on Earth.

Ryder is working alone, attacking nightclubs for Skrulls. Riot is revealed to have survived and is looking on Match.com for a woman. The 3-D Man II is not an active participant. It was later revealed that Ryder has obtained some means of reviving his former teammates via an unknown liquid. The miniseries' second issue ends with Moonstomp's head reanimating as his body begins to grow back and Ryder prepares to inform him that the current President of the United States is an African American. Ryder succeeds in reviving Moonstomp, Dice, and Catwalk. The reunited team then faces off against the descendants of the Skrulls that were hypnotized into being cows. Following the battle against the Skrulls, Moonstomp leaves the team.

It is later revealed that, in addition to cows, the Fantastic Four had transformed one of the original Skrull invaders into a duck. The duck was eaten by a young Chinese-American girl named Tara Tam, who gained superhuman abilities as a result. The members of the Skrull Kill Krew tried to recruit Tara as part of the group, but she turned them down out of fear over how her parents would react. Years later, Tara would become the partner of Howard the Duck.

Membership

Current

 Ryder - Founder and leader. In addition to shapeshifting, he can teleport, has enhanced strength and reflexes, and carries many firearms. He prefers to animate his hair into snake-like  tentacles. In the relaunched Skrull Kill Krew (vol. 2) #1-5, it is implied that he may be one of the Skrulls that were turned into cows who ultimately was able to grant himself a human appearance, but losing his memory in the process and believing himself a regular human affected by Skrullovoria-Induced Skrullophobia.
 The 3-D Man II - An African American who inherited his powers from the 3-D Man I, a 1950s anti-Skrull hero. Able to recognize Skrulls with his powers; used the 3-D Man I's goggles to focus his ability, ultimately believing them to be granted by the item, until their destruction forced him to rely on himself.
 Riot - Punk rocker. Turns into an armored insectoid form. In this form she has great strength and sharp spines. Was stuck in that form for an extended period. Appeared to have died at Camp Hammond after finally reverting to human form. It is later revealed that she survived and was working with Ryder, though grudgingly. Riot is also looking on Match.com for a lesbian dating partner, though she has trouble reverting to her human form again.
 Catwalk - Former fashion model who transforms into a feline/humanoid form. In this form, she has enhanced athletic abilities, claws and fangs.
 Dice - Former surfer. He can breathe underwater and transform his limbs into weapons, which project explosive blasts.

Former
 Moonstomp - British neo-Nazi skinhead. Hates Skrulls so much that he is willing to work with Ryder (a black man), even though he feels like he is compromising his values by doing so. He has some shapeshifting powers, but prefers to bash his foes with a normal claw hammer. During the series, his degenerative condition worsens, causing him to develop patches of dark skin, which displeases him immensely.

Collected editions

In other media
In 2006 it was revealed that the series was considered for a TV series adaptation, but it never came to fruition.

References

External links
 Review of trade paperback and another, Comics Bulletin
 Review of Skrull Kill Krew (vol. 2) #1, Comics Bulletin
 
 
 
 

Comics characters introduced in 1995